María Alejandra de León Guzmán (born 19 August 1983), known as Alejandra de León, is a Guatemalan retired footballer who played as a midfielder. She has been a member of the Guatemala women's national team.

International career
De León capped for Guatemala at senior level during the 2012 CONCACAF Women's Olympic Qualifying Tournament (and its qualification).

References

1983 births
Living people
Guatemalan women's footballers
Guatemala women's international footballers
Women's association football midfielders
Guatemalan women's futsal players